Life at Forsbyholm Manor (Swedish: Livet på Forsbyholm) is a 1948 Swedish comedy film directed by Elof Ahrle and Arne Mattsson and starring Sickan Carlsson, Egon Larsson and Nils Ericsson. It as shot at the Råsunda Studios in Stockholm and on location in Värmdö and Sigtuna. The film's sets were designed by the art director Nils Svenwall.

Synopsis
At a Swedish boarding school the head embarks on a liberal new regime, but in order to get the government funding he needs he first has to prove himself by handing a problem student. On top of this a new female teacher arrives.

Cast
 Sickan Carlsson as Britt Lange
 Egon Larsson as 	Rutger von Hake
 Nils Ericsson as Gösta Bergmark
 Douglas Håge as 	Wiik
 John Botvid as 	Spira
 Thor Modéen as 	August von Hake
 Marianne Löfgren as 	Agneta von Hake
 Mona Geijer-Falkner as Cleaning-lady		
 Artur Rolén as 	Kärrson

References

Bibliography 
 Krawc, Alfred. International Directory of Cinematographers, Set- and Costume Designers in Film: Denmark, Finland, Norway, Sweden (from the beginnings to 1984). Saur, 1986.
 Qvist, Per Olov & von Bagh, Peter. Guide to the Cinema of Sweden and Finland. Greenwood Publishing Group, 2000.

External links 
 

1948 films
Swedish comedy films
1948 comedy films
1940s Swedish-language films
Films directed by Elof Ahrle
Films directed by Arne Mattsson
Swedish black-and-white films
1940s Swedish films